Defending champion Margaret Court defeated Rosie Casals in the final, 6–2, 2–6, 6–1 to win the women's singles tennis title at the 1970 US Open. With the win, Court completed the Grand Slam, becoming the first woman in the Open Era to do so. It was her record-breaking 20th major singles title, surpassing Helen Wills Moody's all-time tally.

Seeds

Draw

Finals

Top half

Section 1

Section 2

Bottom half

Section 3

Section 4

External links
1970 US Open – Women's draws and results at the International Tennis Federation

US Open (tennis) by year – Women's singles
Women's Singles
US Open – Women's Singles
US Open – Women's Singles